Eva Thulin is a Swedish actress who appeared in Italian cinema.

Career
Thulin graduated from Lund University in Malmö and was a performer at the Malmö National Theatre. She presented her thesis with an essay on the work of Harold Pinter, whose works Thulin performed on some occasions on the stage of the Malmö Theatre. She had a short period of notoriety in Italian cinema in the late sixties and early seventies, thanks to her participation in genre and drama films of the time, and her appearance on some magazine covers. She is also remembered for her part in the Italian musical film Zum Zum Zum nº 2 (1969), directed by Bruno Corbucci. Other film appearances include La stagione dei sensi (1969) by Massimo Franciosa, and The Seducers (1969) by Ottavio Alessi, in which her character takes part in a lesbian threesome with the characters of Rosalba Neri and Edwige Fenech, although this is only implied in some cuts of the film.

Filmography
 Zum Zum Zum nº 2 (1969)
 La stagione dei sensi (1969)
 The Seducers (1969)
 L'Invasion (1970)

References

External links
 

Swedish film actresses
Swedish stage actresses
Living people
Year of birth missing (living people)